Luís Dialisson de Souza Alves  (born 13 December 1986), commonly known as Apodi, is a Brazilian footballer who plays as a right back for Goiás.

Honours 
 Vitória
 Campeonato Baiano: 2007, 2009

 Cruzeiro 
 Campeonato Mineiro: 2008

 Ceará 
 Campeonato Cearense: 2012

Chapecoense
 Campeonato Catarinense: 2017

References

External links

 cruzeiro.com.br
 CBF
 sambafoot
 Apodi on youtube

1986 births
Living people
Sportspeople from Rio Grande do Norte
Brazilian footballers
Campeonato Brasileiro Série A players
Campeonato Brasileiro Série B players
Saudi Professional League players
Esporte Clube Vitória players
Cruzeiro Esporte Clube players
Santos FC players
Guarani FC players
Ceará Sporting Club players
Esporte Clube Bahia players
Sport Club do Recife players
Querétaro F.C. footballers
SC Bastia players
FC Kuban Krasnodar players
Ohod Club players
Centro Sportivo Alagoano players
Associação Chapecoense de Futebol players
Associação Atlética Ponte Preta players
Goiás Esporte Clube players
J2 League players
Tokyo Verdy players
Liga MX players
Russian Premier League players
Brazilian expatriate footballers
Expatriate footballers in Japan
Expatriate footballers in Mexico
Expatriate footballers in France
Expatriate footballers in Saudi Arabia
Expatriate footballers in Russia
Brazilian expatriate sportspeople in Japan
Brazilian expatriate sportspeople in France
Brazilian expatriate sportspeople in Saudi Arabia
Brazilian expatriate sportspeople in Mexico
Association football defenders